In mathematics, complex cobordism is a generalized cohomology theory related to cobordism of manifolds. Its spectrum is denoted by MU. It is an exceptionally powerful cohomology theory, but can be quite hard to compute, so often instead of using it directly one uses some slightly weaker theories derived from it, such as Brown–Peterson cohomology or Morava K-theory, that are easier to compute.

The generalized homology and cohomology complex cobordism theories were introduced by  using the Thom spectrum.

Spectrum of complex cobordism

Complex bordism is a generalized homology theory, corresponding to a spectrum MU that can be described explicitly in terms of Thom spaces as follows.

The space  is the Thom space of the universal -plane bundle over the classifying space  of the unitary group .

The nilpotence theorem states that, for any ring spectrum , the kernel of  consists of nilpotent elements. Thus,  must be in the kernel.)

Formal group laws
 and  showed that the coefficient ring  (equal to the complex cobordism of a point, or equivalently the ring of cobordism classes of stably complex manifolds) is a polynomial ring  on infinitely many generators  of positive even degrees.

Write  for infinite dimensional complex projective space, which is the classifying space for complex line bundles, so that tensor product of line bundles induces a map  A complex orientation on an associative commutative ring spectrum E is an element x in  whose restriction to  
is 1, if the latter ring is identified with the coefficient ring of E. A spectrum E with such an element x is called a complex oriented ring spectrum.

If E is a complex oriented ring spectrum, then

Complex cobordism has a natural complex orientation.  showed that there is a natural isomorphism from its coefficient ring to Lazard's universal ring, making the formal group law of complex cobordism into the universal formal group law. In other words, for any formal group law F over any commutative ring R, there is a unique ring homomorphism from MU*(point) to R such that F is the pullback of the formal group law of complex cobordism.

Brown–Peterson cohomology
Complex cobordism over the rationals can be reduced to ordinary cohomology over the rationals, so the main interest is in the torsion of complex cobordism. It is often easier to study the torsion one prime at a time by localizing MU at a prime p; roughly speaking this means one kills off torsion prime to p. In practice one often does calculations with Brown–Peterson cohomology rather than with complex cobordism. Knowledge of the Brown–Peterson cohomologies of a space for all primes p is roughly equivalent to knowledge of its complex cobordism.

Conner–Floyd classes

The ring  is isomorphic to the formal power series ring  where the elements cf are called Conner–Floyd classes. They are the analogues of Chern classes for complex cobordism.

Similarly  is isomorphic to the polynomial ring

Cohomology operations

The Hopf algebra MU*(MU) is isomorphic to the polynomial algebra R[b1, b2, ...], where R is the reduced bordism ring of a 0-sphere.

The coproduct is given by

where the notation2i means take the piece of degree 2i. This can be interpreted as follows. The map

is a continuous automorphism of the ring of formal power series in x, and the coproduct of MU*(MU) gives the composition of two such automorphisms.

See also

Adams–Novikov spectral sequence
List of cohomology theories
Algebraic cobordism

Notes

References

. 

 

. Translation of 

.

External links
Complex bordism at the manifold atlas

Algebraic topology